The Manistee Intermediate School District (Manistee ISD) is an intermediate school district in Michigan, headquartered in Manistee.

Most of Manistee County is served by the Manistee Intermediate School District, which coordinates the efforts of local boards of education, but has no operating authority over schools. Local school boards in Michigan retain great autonomy over day-to-day operations.

Governance
The Manistee Intermediate School District is governed by a publicly elected board of education, who is responsible for hiring a superintendent.

Composition
The Manistee Intermediate School District includes four public school districts, one charter school, two private schools, and one community college.

Public school districts
As of the 2015-2016 school year, the communities of Manistee County are served by the following members of the Manistee Intermediate School District:
 Bear Lake Schools
 Kaleva Norman Dickson Schools
 Manistee Area Public Schools
 Onekama Consolidated Schools

Charter school
The Manistee Intermediate School District includes the Casman Alternative Academy charter school.

Private schools
The Manistee Intermediate School District includes two private schools, including Catholic Central High School.

Community college
The Manistee Intermediate School District includes West Shore Community College.

See also
 List of intermediate school districts in Michigan

References

External links
 

Education in Manistee County, Michigan
Intermediate school districts in Michigan